Brocketsbrae railway station served the hamlet of Brocketsbrae, South Lanarkshire, Scotland, from 1866 to 1951 on the Lesmahagow Junction to Bankend Colliery line.

History 
The station was opened on 1 December 1866 by the Caledonian Railway. Opposite the platform was the signal box, which opened in 1891. To the southwest was the goods yard and on the east side was an engine shed, also known as Brocketsbrae Shed. It was renamed Lesmahagow on 1 June 1869 but its name was changed back to Brocketsbrae on 1 June 1905, a month before the new Lesmahagow station opened. The station closed on 1 October 1951 but it remained open to goods traffic until 21 September 1953.

References 

Disused railway stations in South Lanarkshire
Former Caledonian Railway stations
Railway stations in Great Britain opened in 1866
Railway stations in Great Britain closed in 1951
1866 establishments in Scotland
1951 disestablishments in Scotland